Nikolai Maltsev (born 15 April 1986) is a Russian futsal player who plays for Viz-Sinara and the Russian national futsal team.

References

External links
UEFA profile
AMFR profile

1986 births
Living people
Russian men's futsal players